Contra Unit is a villainous professional wrestling stable in Major League Wrestling (MLW) and Southern Honor Wrestling (SHW). It consists of Ikuro Kwon and Mads Krügger. In SHW (where Krügger is known as “The Heathen” Krule), the group also consists of Brooklyn and “The Black Cloud” Joe Black (as of May 2022).

The stable was formed at the SuperFight event on February 2, 2019 when Fatu and Samael made their MLW debut and formed their alliance with Gotch by attacking his opponent Ace Romero. The group made its televised debut at Intimidation Games and dominated MLW roster throughout the year, becoming the top villainous group of the company. The group cemented its dominance over MLW when Fatu won the World Heavyweight Championship at Kings of Colosseum on July 6, 2019. Ikuro Kwon was added to the group as its fourth member in August. 

Following a storyline where Contra took over and shut down MLW in May 2020 and were subsequently ousted from power in October of the same year, they were joined a masked man known as The Black Hand of Contra on November 18, who was then renamed "Mads Krügger" on the December 2 episode of Fusion. The group would then add Daivari to their ranks at the 2021 Kings of Colosseum. The group would lose Gotch and Daivari and then seem to disband at War Chamber 2021 after losing Fatu and Samael. This would not be the case, however and the group survives with Kwon and Krugger as members.

History

Background and formation (2019)

Jacob Fatu and The Almighty Sheik were previously a part of a stable called the "Warbeast" with Brody King and Kevin Sullivan and competed on the independent circuit winning many tag team titles in various promotions. In January 2019, Warbeast members Fatu and Sheik signed a contract with Major League Wrestling and MLW announced on its website that Jacob Fatu would make his MLW debut at SuperFight. Sheik was repackaged as Josef Samael and he and Fatu made their MLW debut in a non-televised match by defeating local wrestlers Chico Adams and Kwame Nas at SuperFight. Later at the event, the duo allied themselves with Simon Gotch by attacking his opponent Ace Romero, during which Gotch proclaimed that the group as "global merchants of violence" and named it "Contra" and waved a self-designated Contra flag. The pair made its televised debut at Intimidation Games by attacking Tom Lawlor after he retained the MLW World Heavyweight Championship against Low Ki in a steel cage match. Contra Unit led another attack on Ace Romero during Romero's match against Simon Gotch on the March 9 episode of Fusion. The next week, on Fusion, Fatu and Samael had their first televised match in MLW against Chico Adams and Vertigo Rivera, where they got themselves disqualified after Samael brutalized them with his spike. Fatu entered the titular match at the Battle Riot II on April 5, where Contra poured gas on various participants, which led to them being disqualified from the match. Later that night, Contra attacked Tom Lawlor again during a post-event press conference.

Contra Unit planned a hostile takeover of MLW, continuing its dominance and rise as Fatu ended Barrington Hughes' undefeated streak in MLW in a quick match on the May 11 episode of Fusion. Fatu and Samael would go on to defeat Hughes and Romero in a tag team match on the May 25 episode of Fusion. Later at that episode, Contra Unit attacked Low Ki as well as Tom Lawlor for the third time after Lawlor's successful title defense against Avalanche.

Ascension to the top and MLW takeover (2019–2020)

Lawlor enlisted the help of Marshall and Ross Von Erich to feud with Contra Unit as the team of Lawlor and Von Erichs defeated Contra Unit in a six-man tag team match. The feud between Lawlor and Contra Unit intensified, which set up a match between Fatu and Lawlor for the World Heavyweight Championship at Kings of Colosseum on July 6, which Fatu won, thus capturing the title and cementing Contra Unit's dominance over MLW.

The rivalry continued between Contra Unit and the team of Lawlor and Von Erichs, leading up to a War Chamber match at the namesake event. Contra Unit introduced a fourth member Ikuro Kwon on the August 3 episode of Fusion, who spit mist into Marshall Von Erich's eyes. Low Ki would soon join Lawlor and Von Erichs in the feud by helping them fend off an attack by Contra Unit after Fatu successfully defended the World Heavyweight Championship against Lawlor in a rematch on the August 31 episode of Fusion. Contra Unit would lose to Low Ki, Lawlor and Von Erichs in the titular match at War Chamber to settle the rivalry.

Contra Unit's next feud was against Salina de la Renta's stable Promociones Dorado, which began after LA Park decided to cash in his Golden Ticket opportunity by winning the Battle Riot against Jacob Fatu for the World Heavyweight Championship at MLW's first-ever pay-per-view Saturday Night SuperFight on November 2. In the warm-up to the match, Promociones Dorado members LA Park, Bestia 666 and Mecha Wolf defeated Kwon, Gotch and Samael in a six-man tag team match on the final episode of Fusion before the pay-per-view. However, Fatu retained the title against Park at Saturday Night SuperFight.

Contra would plant the seeds of a potential feud with The Hart Foundation after Josef Samael threw a fireball on Teddy Hart, thus costing the latter, the World Middleweight Championship against Myron Reed on the November 11 episode of Fusion. Hart would subsequently depart MLW while Contra would then resume their feud with the Von Erichs as Fatu issued a World Heavyweight Championship opportunity to Marshall Von Erich. However, Marshall was mysteriously attacked and his brother Ross Von Erich challenged Fatu instead but was defeated after Tom Lawlor betrayed Ross. Contra would wreak havoc in Japan in November, leading to a six-man tag team match on the January 1, 2020 episode of Fusion, in which Fatu, Kwon and Gotch defeated Strong Hearts (Cima, El Lindaman and Shigehiro Irie). The feud with the Strong Hearts would conclude with Fatu retaining the World Heavyweight Championship against Cima on the March 7 episode of Fusion.

Hart Foundation would begin feuding with Contra to avenge Contra's attack on Teddy Hart, which led to Davey Boy Smith, Jr. defeating Gotch in a No Holds Barred match on the February 1 episode of Fusion and Fatu retained the World Heavyweight Championship against Brian Pillman Jr. on the February 8 episode of Fusion. On the May 10 episode of Fusion, Contra attacked several MLW wrestlers in the backstage area and took over MLW's headquarters, thus taking over the promotion and "shutting it down" (storyline explanation for MLW's hiatus due to the COVID-19 pandemic). Injustice member Kotto Brazil was one of the wrestlers injured in the assault which ended his MLW career as an explanation for his legitimate departure from the promotion.

Expansion and departures (2020-present)
Contra was ousted from power in October and MLW resumed events on the November 18 episode of Fusion, where Fatu retained the World Heavyweight Championship against Davey Boy Smith, Jr. Alexander Hammerstone confronted Fatu after the match and was attacked by the debuting The Black Hand of Contra, who was later revealed to be Mads Krügger. On the December 9 episode of Fusion, Fatu and Gotch challenged The Von Erichs for the World Tag Team Championship and the match ended in a no contest after Injustice member Jordan Oliver and Violence is Forever interfered in the match and attacked all the competitors. Oliver would soon begin challenging Gotch to a match to avenge the attack on Kotto Brazil in May, setting up a match between Gotch and Oliver at Kings of Colosseum on January 6, 2021. However, Gotch faked injury and the match was cancelled. However, later at the event, Contra attacked Injustice after Myron Reed lost the World Middleweight Championship to Lio Rush. The debuting Daivari would get involved in the attack thus becoming the newest member of Contra Unit. Krügger would challenge Hammerstone for the National Openweight Championship at the event and the match ended in a double count-out.

Gotch and Oliver had a match on the January 20 episode of Fusion, which Gotch won via referee stoppage. On the February 3 episode of Fusion, Hammerstone defended the National Openweight Championship against Krügger in a Baklei Brawl, which Hammerstone won to retain but it was revealed to be a fake Krügger as the real Krügger attacked Hammerstone after the match. Fatu retained the World Heavyweight Championship against Oliver on the March 3 episode of Fusion and Contra attacked Injustice after the match but Calvin Tankman made the save and challenged Fatu to a match for the title. In the meanwhile, Daivari and Gotch competed against Los Parks and Injustice in a three-way match for the World Tag Team Championship on the March 17 episode of Fusion, where Los Parks retained the titles. At Never Say Never, Gotch lost to Oliver and Daivari lost to Reed while Fatu retained the World Heavyweight Championship against Tankman due to outside interference by Daivari. On October 2 at Fightland Fatu lost the world title to Alexander Hammerstone, ending his record setting reign at 819 days. The stable would seemingly dissolve at War Chamber after losing the titular match to the Hammerheads. This was also heavily implied to be the case by MLW's YouTube channel, which stated Kwon had denounced Contra and left, Fatu going on his own way and Krügger vowing revenge, along with Josef Samael being released and removed from MLW's Roster page on MLW.com. This would be ignored, however in future episodes of Fusion, which would have Kwon providing backup for Krügger, both men having Contra logos in their entrance videos and commentators referring to Contra in the present tense along with referencing Krügger and Kwon looking for new members. 

On May 6, 2022, Krügger competed at SHW39 for Southern Honor Wrestling (where he is known as “The Heathen” Krule). He faced Dylan James (aka Sunny Daze) in a Chain Match with the stipulation being that if Krule won, Dylan would lose his job as booker of the company and would be replaced by Krule’s wife, Brooklyn. However, if Dylan won, Brooklyn would be fired from SHW. With the Chain Match being no disqualification, Krule ended up defeating Dylan James with the assistance of “The Black Cloud” Joe Black. Thus, giving Brooklyn control of SHW. Later in the show, there would be a Triple Threat Match for the Southern Honor Championship, with the champion Owen Knight defending against Cyrus The Destroyer and “The Priest of Punishment” Judas (aka Judais from the NWA). During the match after taking out Owen Knight, the two big men, Cyrus and Judas, would fight their way through the crowd and towards the backstage area. Meanwhile, with Knight still down in the ring, Brooklyn would appear on stage with Krule and Joe Black by her side, and with her first order of business as SHW’s new booker, she would immediately turn the championship match into a Fatal Four-Way Match. Krule then entered the ring and finished off Owen Knight with his finishing maneuver, Scorched Earth, to win and become the new Southern Honor Champion. This made Krule a two-time SHW Champion (having previously won the title in 2019, then known as Logan Creed). After Krule won the match, Brooklyn and Joe Black would enter the ring holding up a Contra flag and then draping it over Owen Knight, who was still laid out in the middle of the ring. The show would end with Krule attacking multiple members of the SHW staff working at ringside before posing on stage with the SHW Championship belt alongside Brooklyn and Black with the Contra flag.

Members

Current

Former

Timeline

Championships and accomplishments
All Pro Wrestling
APW Tag Team Championship (1 time, current) - Josef Samael & Jacob Fatu
Major League Wrestling
MLW World Heavyweight Championship (1 time) – Jacob Fatu
PCW Ultra 
PCW Ultra Tag Team Championship (1 time, current) - Josef Samael & Jacob Fatu
Pro Wrestling Illustrated
Ranked Jacob Fatu No. 306 of the top 500 singles wrestlers in the PWI 500 in 2019

References

External links
Jacob Fatu's profile at Major League Wrestling
Simon Gotch's profile at Major League Wrestling 
Josef Samael's profile at Major League Wrestling
Ikuro Kwon's profile at Major League Wrestling
Mads Krügger's profile at Major League Wrestling
Daivari's profile at Major League Wrestling

Major League Wrestling teams and stables